Nurullah Genç (born September 9, 1960) is a noted Turkish poet and novelist. The Cambridge History of Turkey cites him as a principal Turkish author for the period 1981-1999.

Poetry books 
 Çiçekler Üşümesin
 Nuyageva
 Yankı ve Hüzün
 Aşkım İsyandır Benim
 Siyah Gözlerine Beni de Götür
 Yanılgı Saatleri
 Yağmur
 Rüveyda Yıldırım
 Denizin Son Martıları
 Aşk Ölümcül Bir Hülyadır
 Hüznün Lalesidir Dünya
 Gül ve Ben
 Yürüyelim Seninle İstanbul'da
 Müptelâdır Gemiler Benim Denizlerime
 Sensiz Kalan Bu Şehri Yakmayı Çok istedim
 Birkaç Deli Güvercin
 Çanakkale:Her Şey Yanıp Gül Oldu
 Ateş Semazenleri
 Ölüm Noktürnü

Novels 
 Tutkular Keder Oldu
 Yollar Dönüşe Gider
 İntizar

Occupational Books 
 Zirveye Götüren Yol:Yönetim
 Yönetim El Kitabı
 Başarı Bedel İster
 Yönetim ve Organizasyon
 Kalite Liderliği
 Ortaklık Kültürü

References

Further reading
Coverage in Hurriyet newspaper (in Turkish)
Coverage in Sabah newspaper (in Turkish)

Turkish novelists
Turkish poets
1960 births
Living people